Lu Ji (261–303), courtesy name Shiheng, was a Chinese essayist, military general, politician, and writer who lived during the late Three Kingdoms period and Jin dynasty of China. He was the fourth son of Lu Kang, a general of the state of Eastern Wu in the Three Kingdoms period, and a grandson of Lu Xun, a prominent general and statesman who served as the third Imperial Chancellor of Eastern Wu.

Life
Lu Ji was related to the imperial family of the state of Eastern Wu. He was the fourth son of the general Lu Kang, who was a maternal grandson of Sun Ce, the elder brother and predecessor of Eastern Wu's founding emperor, Sun Quan. His paternal grandfather, Lu Xun, was a prominent general and statesman who served as the third Imperial Chancellor of Eastern Wu.  After the Jin dynasty conquered Eastern Wu in 280 and killed two of his brothers, Lu Ji, along with his brother Lu Yun, fled to Hua Ting in exile.  While in exile, Lu wrote Dialectic of Destruction on the fall of the Wu empire.  In 290, Lu and his brother moved to the Jin imperial capital, Luoyang. He served as a writer under the Jin government and was appointed president of the imperial academy.  In 296, he was appointed a military position.  Lu's army suffered major casualties in a battle against Sima Ai in November 303 as part of the War of the Eight Princes.  Shortly thereafter, Lu, his sons, and his two brothers were charged with treason and executed.

Writings

Lu Ji wrote much lyric poetry but is better known for writing fu, a mixture of prose and poetry. He is best remembered for the Wen fu (文賦; On Literature), a piece of literary criticism that discourses on the principles of composition. Achilles Fang commented: 

English translations of the Wen fu were done by E.R. Hughes and Achilles Fang.  Chen Shixiang translated Wen fu into verse because, although the piece was rightly called the beginning of Chinese literary criticism, Lu Ji wrote it as poetry.  Poets who have been influenced by Lu's Wen fu include Ezra Pound, Gary Snyder, Howard Nemirov, Eleanor Wilner, and Carolyn Kizer. 

Lu Ji is also the writer of the oldest extant work of Chinese calligraphy, a short letter to his friends that has been named the Pingfutie (Consoling Letter).

See also

 Lists of people of the Three Kingdoms

Notes

References
 2005 Encyclopædia Britannica, copyrighted 1994-2005
 Li, Siyong and Wei, Fengjuan, "Li Ji". Encyclopedia of China (Chinese Literature Edition), 1st ed.

External links
 Lu Chi's Wen Fu - The Art of Writing

261 births
303 deaths
4th-century executions
Eastern Wu poets
Executed Jin dynasty (266–420) people
Jin dynasty (266–420) essayists
Jin dynasty (266–420) generals
Jin dynasty (266–420) poets
Jin dynasty (266–420) politicians
People executed by the Jin dynasty (266–420) by decapitation
Political office-holders in Shandong
Rhetoricians